Minoa euthecta is a moth in the family Geometridae. It is found in Australia.

References

Moths described in 1904
Asthenini
Moths of Australia